Upton is a village on the River Bure in Norfolk, England within the Broads national park.

The villages name means 'higher farm/settlement'.

Administratively it comes under the civil parish of Upton with Fishley which in turn comes under the district of Broadland.

St. Margaret's Church is built in the Perpendicular style.

At the end of the dyke, there is a rare post mill, Palmers Hollow Post Mill. Upton Boat Dyke Marshes is a Site of Special Scientific Interest in the care of Norfolk Wildlife Trust. Upton Broads and Marshes is a Special Area of Conservation (SAC).

Upton Fen, a nature reserve in the care of Norfolk Wildlife Trust, is nearby, also Upton Broad.

References

External links

Villages in Norfolk
Broadland